The Uka Tarsadia University is a Private University located in Bardoli, Surat, Gujarat, India. It was established by Tushar Patel and B.U. Patel, founders of Tarsadia Investments.

Programmes
Ph.D. Programmes
Post Graduate Programmes
Graduate Programmes
Diploma Programmes
Certification Programmes

Constituent Institutes
Shrimad Rajchandra Institute of Management & Computer Application
Babu Madhav Institute of Information & Technology (BMIIT)
C.G.Bhakta Institute of Biotechnology
Maliba Pharmacy College
Chhotubhai Gopalbhai Patel Institute of Technology (CGPIT)
B.V.Patel Institute of Management, 
B.V.Patel Institute of Computer & Information Technology
B.V.Patel Institute of Commerce 
Maliba-Bhula Nursing College
Shrimad Rajchandra School of Sports
Shrimad Rajchandra College of Physiotherapy
Department Of Computer Science And Technology
Diwaliba Polytechnic, Maliba Mahuva Campus
Raman Bhakta School of Architecture (RBSA)
Godavariba School of Interior Design (GSID)
Jaymin School of Fashion Design & Technology (JFDT)
Asha M. Tarsadia Institute of Computer Science and Technology

Departments
Department of Computer Science and Technology
Department of Chemistry
Department of Management & Commerce
Department of Physics
Department of Mathematics

References

Universities in Gujarat
Surat district
2011 establishments in Gujarat
Educational institutions established in 2011
Technical education